Saint Bede's School is a coeducational secondary school and sixth form in the English town of Redhill, Surrey. In the most recent Ofsted inspection, the school was graded as "outstanding" in all areas.  It now has over 1700 male and female pupils aged 11–18 (Years 7–13), with around 330 students in the sixth form. Classes have an average of 28 pupils. The latest Ofsted report listed in the references provides further background information about the school, as does the school website.

History
Bishop Simpson Church of England Girls School amalgamated with St Joseph’s Catholic (mixed) School to form St Bede’s School which opened in September 1976 as a joint Church of England and Roman Catholic school and later included free churches on its governing body. It claims to be the first such fully ecumenical school in the world.

Building works
Between 1988 and 1999 the school underwent large-scale building works to bring the school together on its present site, and to create new facilities for a library, ICT and careers. In 2004 a new arts centre was opened and in 2006 a sports hall was opened. Starting in 2018, construction began to expand the school's capacity.

References

External links
Main school website

Educational institutions established in 1976
Secondary schools in Surrey
1976 establishments in England
Christian schools in England
Church of England secondary schools in the Diocese of Southwark
Catholic secondary schools in the Diocese of Arundel and Brighton
Voluntary aided schools in England